is a 2002 Japanese comedy film directed by Takashi Miike. It is based on the autobiographical novel Tōgenkyō no hito-bito by Yūji Aoki.

Plot
The wealthy businessman Korijima of Uwazoko-ya declares bankruptcy, leaving a 10-million-yen contract unpaid to Shosuke Umemoto's printing shop and thereby leaving Shosuke's brother Chusuke unable to repay a 9-million-yen loan to the loan shark Shoko. Shosuke plans to kill himself in his car through carbon monoxide poisoning but stops to assist a man from a nearby homeless village who has been injured by members of the Seiryu mob for threatening to tell the police about their illegal dumping of trash in the village. In return, the members of the village make use their various ingenious resources as they embark on a complex scheme to blackmail Korijima.

The liquidator arrives and take everything in Shosuke's printing shop apart from Shosuke's father's prized Heidel printer. The liquidator leaves Shosuke 1.3 million yen and schedules the pickup of the office supplies on the evening of the 27th. The homeless village's Mayor borrows 600,000 yen from Shosuke. The village's Deputy Kuwata, a former postal worker, gives it to Mr. Okajima to buy 100 shares in Dango Construction, a company with close ties to the Department of Public Works. When Shoko demands the repayment of Chusuke's loan, the Mayor secretly reveals himself to Shoko as Kiyota the Hitman and convinces Shoko to forgive the debt and give him ten blank checks, which Shosuke uses to forge bank drafts using Dango's seal. They leave the drafts in a wallet at an ATM. When the wallet is discovered by a man, they suggest to the man that he should have the newspaper write a story about it in order to ensure that he gets a reward for finding the bank drafts, thereby ensuring uncertainty among investors and lowering the share price.

Kiyota's former lover Mari, who is still struggling to make ends meet in the city, has become pregnant by her new lover yet still lends Kiyota money to accomplish his scheme. Seisuke and his wife leave his children and his elderly mother with his brother and run away to the homeless village before the liquidator comes.

They use the Heidel printer to create four-color flyers advertising a fresh fish festival on the front but with pictures on the back of Korijima's 8.3-billion-yen private assets discovered by Ume, a former private detective now living in the village. They extort 20 million yen from Korijima in exchange for the flyers, plates, photos, and negatives. Dango's share price has dropped significantly in the meantime, allowing the men to buy stock cheaply. News reports that the CEO of Dango has a mistress who is 40 years younger than he is gives investors renewed confidence in his health, causing a rush on shares and driving up the share price. When the share price doubles, they sell all their shares and make a fortune, but the residents of the homeless village decide to give all of the money to Shosuke and his wife to enable them to pay their employees' salaries and return to their life in the city.

Cast
Show Aikawa as The Mayor
Shirō Sano as The Deputy
Yu Tokui as Umemoto
Midoriko Kimura as Fusae
Hoka Kinoshita as Ume
Kogan Ashiya as Uehara
Akaji Maro as Korijima
Shigeru Muroi as Mari
Takashi Ebata as Matsui
Yojin Hino as Takeda
Toshiki Ayata as Etō

Other credits
Produced by
Yoichi Arishige - producer
Kazuhisa Kawaguchi - planner
Shusaku Matsuoka - producer
Kazushi Miki - producer
Tsuneo Ochi - executive producer
Ken Takeuchi - planner
Motomu Tomita - producer
Tsutomu Tsuchikawa - executive producer: Daiei
Production Design: Akira Ishige
Production Manager: Katsuhiro Ogawa
Assistant Director: Bunmei Katō
Sound Department
Yoshiya Obara - sound
Kenji Shibazaki - sound effects
Lighting technician: Akira Ono

References

External links 
 

2002 films
2002 comedy films
Films directed by Takashi Miike
Films based on Japanese novels
Japanese comedy films
2000s Japanese-language films
2000s Japanese films